Votorantim S.A. is a permanently capitalized investment holding company, with a long-term investment approach. Its portfolio companies operate in 16 countries and in different economic sectors, as building materials, finance, aluminum, clean and renewable energy, metals and mining, orange juice, long steel, growth, real estate, and infrastructure.

Votorantim is one of the few Brazilian companies  with investment grade rating by the three main rating agencies in the world: Standard & Poors, Fitch Ratings and Moody's. 

The company is also a member of FCLTGlobal, a non-profit organization that produces research and tools that promote long-term investment and business strategies,  and signatory of the UN Global Compact since 2011.

History 
It was founded in 1918 by José Ermírio de Moraes, an engineer from Pernambuco. Its model of corporate governance assures the Ermírio Morais family strategic controlling positions in the executive board. The Brazilian businessman Antônio Ermírio de Moraes was the representative of the family business, while non-family professionals are at the head of the Business Units.

Overview 
In 2021, Votorantim and CPP Investments announced a plan to consolidate energy assets in Brazil, creating a company to be listed on the ‘Novo Mercado’ segment of the B3 Stock Change. In 2022, this company was named Auren Energia and debuted on Brazil's stock market.

Subsidiaries
The company’s portfolio includes leading companies from different economy sectors. They are: 

Votorantim Cimentos - Building materials and sustainable solutions
Banco BV  - Finance and banking
Companhia Brasileira de Aluminio - Aluminum
Auren Energia - Clean and renewable energy
Nexa Resources - Metals and mining
Citrosuco - Orange juice
Acerbrag - Long steel
Altre - Real estate
23S Capital - Growth 
CCR - Infrastructure and mobility

Board and Management
Eduardo Vassimon (Chairman)
João Schmidt (CEO)

References

External links
Votorantim Cimentos Pushes Brazil IPO Plans to $12.7 Billion April 17, 2013 Bloomberg.com

 
Companies based in São Paulo
Conglomerate companies of Brazil
Privately held companies of Brazil